= Leah Stavenhagen =

American advocate for women with ALS

Leah Stavenhagen (1993 – February 19, 2026) was an American advocate for women with Amyotrophic Lateral Sclerosis (ALS). She was the founder of the nonprofit organization Her ALS Story.

== Biography ==
Stavenhagen was born in Seattle and lived in multiple cities, including Copenhagen, when she was growing up. She enjoyed dancing and synchronized swimming.

She later attended the University of Michigan, graduating in 2015 with majors in French, political science and comparative literature. While in college, she met Hugo Taubmann, whom she later married. She subsequently moved to New York City and then to Paris, where she worked as a consultant for EY.

In 2018, when she was 26, she began to trip and fall more often. The following year, she was diagnosed with ALS.

Stavenhagen founded Her ALS Story in 2021 to raise awareness and provide a community to young women experiencing ALS, and challenge the image of the disease as something that solely afflicted men like Stephen Hawking or Lou Gehrig. At the time of her death, the group had more than 160 members. The group meets via Zoom calls and holds an annual retreat in Massachusetts.

An avid traveler, Stavenhagen died while traveling in Egypt on February 19, 2026. She was 33.
